Iqbal Stadium is a Test cricket ground in Faisalabad, Pakistan. Previous names for the ground include Lyallpur Stadium, National Stadium, and City Stadium. It was founded in October 1978.

History
Iqbal Stadium was inaugrated in October 1978. It is named after a poet, Muhammad Iqbal. Capacity is 18,000. It has hosted 25 Test matches and 14 One Day Internationals.  14 of the Tests have been draws. In September 2019, the Pakistan Cricket Board named it as one of the venues to host matches in the 2019–20 Quaid-e-Azam Trophy.

Ground records
First Test: 1st Test, Pakistan vs. India, October 1978.
First ODI: Pakistan vs. New Zealand, November 1984.

Tests
Highest innings total: 6–674 by Pakistan vs. India, October 1984.
Lowest innings total: 53 all out by West Indies vs. Pakistan, October 1986.
Highest individual score: 253 by Sanath Jayasuriya for Sri Lanka vs. Pakistan, October 2004.
Best bowling figures (match): 12–130 (7–76 & 5–54) by Waqar Younis for Pakistan vs. New Zealand, October 1990.

One-day internationals
Highest innings total: 7–314 (50 overs) by Pakistan vs. New Zealand, December 2003.
Highest individual score: 106 by Mohammad Yousuf for Pakistan vs. Bangladesh, September 2003.
Best bowling figures: 4–27 (4 overs) by Mudassar Nazar for Pakistan vs. New Zealand, November 1984.

Profile 
The Iqbal Stadium in Faisalabad is situated in the north of the province of Punjab and is a modern and well-equipped stadium. But no matter how impressive a venue is, not much can be done about the weather and Faisalabad has suffered at the hands of the elements. In 1998–99 fog caused the third Test against Zimbabwe was abandoned without a ball being bowled, while bad light is often an issue especially for matches played during the winter. However, when play has been possible, some memorable performances have taken place. An exciting Test was played out in 1997–98 when South Africa skittles Pakistan for 92, successfully defending a target of 142 on the final day. Then, in 2004–05, Sanath Jayasuriya smashed 253 as Sri Lanka powered to a 201-run victory. But the ground is most famous for the confrontation between Mike Gatting and Shakoor Rana during England's 1987–88 tour, which led to a day being lost during the match and some long-lasting bad feeling between the teams. The Pakistan Cricket Board also conducts its domestic tournaments at this venue. Recently, Super 8 T20 was held here from 11 to 18 May. The stadium itself is only 2 km out of the city centre, which can be reached by a walk through the tree-lined suburbs.

In 2016, 4 new cricket pitches were added to take the total cricket pitches to 9 now.

See also
List of Test cricket grounds
 List of stadiums in Pakistan
 List of cricket grounds in Pakistan
 List of sports venues in Karachi
 List of sports venues in Lahore
 List of sports venues in Faisalabad

References

External links
 Cricinfo Website – Ground Page

Faisalabad District
Test cricket grounds in Pakistan
Faisalabad
Stadiums in Pakistan
Cricket grounds in Pakistan
Cricket in Faisalabad
Memorials to Muhammad Iqbal
1987 Cricket World Cup stadiums
1996 Cricket World Cup stadiums